Nadezda Guskova (born 10 January 1992) is a retired Russian tennis player, two-time Russian tennis champion, singer, philanthropist and journalist.

At the age of 16, she graduated from High School No. 2 (Ramensky, Russia) and was accepted at the MGAFK (Moscow State Academy of Physical Education), where she studied through distance learning program.

Tennis career
Nadezda started playing tennis at the age of five. Her first coach was Sergey Koschienko. During summer months, she trained at the “Meteor” stadium in Zhukovsky, and in winter in the hall of the Sports School.

Guskova has won two singles and four doubles titles on the ITF Circuit in her career. On 28 February 2011, she reached her best singles ranking of world No. 301. On 6 June 2011, she peaked at No. 249 in the WTA doubles rankings.

In 2008, she won a singles title and reached the final in doubles, at the ITF tournament Prince Cup, among juniors in Miami, Florida.

In September 2009, she sustained a serious injury and was unable, temporarily, to play tournaments.

In August 2010, Guskova for the first time became the winner of an ITF tournament in singles, at St. Petersburg, and in December, she won another ITF tournament in Havana, Cuba. From 2010 to 2012, she was coached by Lina Krasnoroutskaya.

Guskova made her WTA Tour debut at the 2010 Tashkent Open, defeating Ekaterina Dzehalevich, Maria Kondratieva and Tatiana Poutchek in the qualifying tournament. In the main draw, she defeated Olga Savchuk in straight sets.

In 2010, at the Russian Tennis Championship in Khanty-Mansiysk, she became double champion: in singles, beating second-seeded Ekaterina Ivanova in the final with a score of 6–4, 6–2, and in doubles with Maria Zharkova. In mixed-doubles competition (paired with Andrey Levin), she reached the final, but after sustaining a serious injury, was forced to retire.

Guskova retired from professional tennis 2012.

Music career
Nadezda Guskova was always interested in music, hence after being forced to leave the Tennis Pro league because of the shoulder injury, she decided to devote herself to her musical career.

In June 2014, a video clip for the song “Make Me Feel” was filmed by the famous clip maker, Aslan Akhmadov. On April 28, 2016, the debut album, "Vremya" (Time), was released, which included 12 songs.

On September 1, 2017, Nadezda performed the song "Vremya" (Time) at the Kremlin. She also had a few songs, "Uletai"(Fly Away), “Angel”, "V Oblakah" (In the Clouds), “Macho”, and "Ne speshi" (Do Not Rush) on a soundtrack for a TV show  "Ulica" (The Street) on TNT channel.

On November 26, 2017, the video clip for the song "Gde-to tam" (Somewhere Out There) was released. It was trending on YouTube for two consecutive days and climbed to number one in charts.

On March 24, 2019, as part of Moscow Fashion Week, Nadezda presented the album “Nashi serdca” (Our hearts) at the fashion show of Russian designer Eleonora Amosova.

On August 6, 2019, the single “Zabolet’ toboy" (Mad about you) was released.

On January 10, 2020, in honor of her birthday, the singer released "Mnogo shuma" (A lot of noise).

Discography

Albums

Singles

Music Videos

TV Journalism
In June 2018, Nadezda Guskova received a diploma in professional television journalism, specializing in TV presenter from the First National School of Television of RSU A.N. Kosygin. She had an internship as a correspondent from July 2 to July 22, 2018 in the Directorate of Information Broadcasting "MIC Izvestia". Nadezda’s first interview was for the newspaper “Rublevka’s Life” with the famous volleyball player Alexander Markin.

Philanthropy
Nadezda Guskova is actively involved with different charities: she takes part in charity events and activities of organizations involved in the upbringing and rehabilitation of children (Futbolka Darit Zhizn (T-shirt Gives Life), Gorod Dobra (City of Good), Bezgranichnue Realnosti (Unlimited Reality), Festival Dobra (Festival of Good), Bezgranizhnue vozmoshnosti (Unlimited Opportunities), Den' Zachitu Detei (Children's Day), Pervui Zvonok (First Day at school), Akziya ot serdza k serdzu (From Heart to Heart), smska Dobra (sms-ka of Good), and many others).

In November 2018, Nadezda Guskova became an ambassador of the brand "ELEONORA AMOSOVA". A strong friendship between the singer and the designer has developed into a close partnership, Nadezda regularly appears at the shows, both, as a model and a VIP guest.

ITF Circuit finals

Singles: 2 (2 titles)

Doubles: 7 (4 titles, 3 runner-ups)

References

External links
 
 

1992 births
Living people
Russian female tennis players